The Riether Werder, also Riethscher Werder , is an island in the Neuwarper See, a bay in the Stettin Lagoon. It is the only island in the lagoon on German territory.

The first recorded mention of the island dates to the year 1252, when Duke Barnim I of Pomerania gifted this island along with other possessions to Eldena Abbey. It was then given it the Slavic name Wozstro. The present name of the island is derived from the village of Rieth on the southern shore of the bay.

The island belongs to the district of Vorpommern-Greifswald in the German state of Mecklenburg-Vorpommern and lies in the extreme northeast of Germany. It has national importance as a bird island. It is 0.79 km² in area and lies about a kilometre from the south and west shore of the Neuwarper See. The sea border with Poland runs immediately past the eastern tip of the island.

Rare bird species such as the common tern and the snipe may be encountered here. White-tailed eagle, Montagu's harrier, marsh harrier, red kite, black kite, kestrel, hobby, honey buzzard and common buzzard are also found here. Access to the island is forbidden; like the west shore of the Neuwarper See it is part of the Altwarp Inland Dunes, Neuwarper See and Riether Werder Nature Reserve.

Footnotes 

German islands in the Baltic
Nature reserves in Mecklenburg-Western Pomerania
Islands of Mecklenburg-Western Pomerania